Bione is a comune in the province of Brescia, Lombardy.

References

Cities and towns in Lombardy